Phymaturus palluma, the high mountain lizard, is a species of lizard in the family Liolaemidae. It is from Chile and Argentina.

References

palluma
Lizards of South America
Reptiles of Chile
Reptiles of Argentina
Reptiles described in 1782
Taxa named by Juan Ignacio Molina